Chembur Assembly constituency is one of the 288 Vidhan Sabha (legislative assembly) constituencies of Maharashtra state in western India.

Overview
Chembur (constituency number 173) is one of the 26 Vidhan Sabha constituencies located in the Mumbai Suburban district. Number of electorates in 2009 was 252,142 (male 137,636, female 114,506).

Chembur is part of the Mumbai South Central constituency along with five other Vidhan Sabha segments, namely Anushakti Nagar in Mumbai Suburban district and Dharavi, Sion Koliwada, Wadala and Mahim in the Mumbai City district.

Members of Legislative Assembly

Election results

2019 result

2014 result

2009 result

See also
 Chembur
 List of constituencies of Maharashtra Vidhan Sabha

References

Assembly constituencies of Mumbai
Politics of Mumbai Suburban district
Assembly constituencies of Maharashtra